,  later known as   was a Japanese daimyō. He was born in Nagao clan, and after adoption into the Uesugi clan, ruled Echigo Province in the Sengoku period of Japan. He was one of the most powerful daimyō of the Sengoku period. Known as the "Dragon of Echigo", while chiefly remembered for his prowess on the battlefield as a military genius, Kenshin is also regarded as an extremely skillful administrator who fostered the growth of local industries and trade and his rule saw a marked rise in the standard of living of Echigo. 

Kenshin is famed for his honourable conduct, his military expertise, a long-standing rivalry with Takeda Shingen, his numerous defensive campaigns to restore order in the Kantō region as the Kanto Kanrei, and his belief in the Buddhist god of war—Bishamonten. Many of his followers and others believed him to be the Avatar of Bishamonten, and called Kenshin the "God of War".

Name
His original name was Nagao Kagetora (長尾景虎). He changed his name to Uesugi Masatora (上杉政虎) when he inherited the Uesugi clan name in order to accept the official title of Kantō Kanrei (関東管領). Later he changed his name again to Uesugi Terutora (上杉輝虎) to honor the 13th shōgun Ashikaga Yoshiteru (足利義輝), and finally to Kenshin (上杉謙信) after he vowed to become a Zen-Buddhist; in particular, he would become renowned for being a devotee of Bishamonten.

Kenshin was born in the Tiger year (Chinese zodiac) and always kept the word "tora" (虎, tiger) in his names. He is respected as "The Tiger of Echigo" for his intelligent capabilities and excellent contributions.

Kenshin is also referred to as "The Dragon of Echigo" because of his Kakarimidareryuu (懸かり亂れ龍) ensign displayed on the battlefield. His rival Takeda Shingen was called "The Tiger of Kai". They fought several times at Battles of Kawanakajima. In some versions of Chinese mythology (Shingen and Kenshin had always been interested in Chinese culture, especially the works of Sun Tzu), the Dragon and Tiger have always been bitter rivals who try to defeat one another, but neither is ever able to gain the upper hand.

His ceremony of departure to war started with praying at the shrine of Bishamonten, a traditional farewell meal with the generals with three dishes (symbolizing good fortune) and three cups, which also symbolized good luck and onmyōdō's heaven, earth and man. It was followed by two shouts "Ei!" (Glory") and "O!" (Yes!) with the assembled troops, also repeated three times, and the army standard lowered to the generals as a way of respect. In the end, Kenshin re-dedicated to the war god with the "bow of Hachiman", and mounted his horse surrounded by three flag banners; first with the first character of the Bishamonten's name, second with the red rising sun on blue (Emperor's gift), and the warring dragon flag.

Early life

Born as Kagetora, he was the third or fourth son of the noted warrior Nagao Tamekage (長尾為景), and his life presents a unique story - he was not from the Uesugi, but Nagao clan. His father's family were the retainers of the Yamanouchi branch of the Uesugi clan, and his father has gained some renown with his military victories over his lords Uesugi Akisada, Uesugi Sadanori and Uesugi Funayoshi. However, in later years, Tamekage found himself at odds with the neighboring Ikkō-ikki of Hokuriku, and as the political power in the region started to shift in favor of the Ikkō-ikki (due largely to the sudden rise of Hongan-ji), the situation for Echigo quickly deteriorated. It came to a peak in 1536, when Kenshin's father gathered up an army and marched westward. However, upon arriving at Sendanno (December 1536) in Etchū, his forces were suddenly attacked by Enami Kazuyori, and in the resulting fracas Tamekage himself was slain, and his army put to flight.

The impact back at Echigo was immediate. Nagao Harukage, Tamekage's eldest son, immediately made his bid for control of the Nagao, and succeeded in this claim after a power struggle which resulted in the death of one of his brothers, Kageyasu. Kenshin was removed from the conflict and relocated to Rinsen-ji temple, where he spent his life from 7 to 14 dedicated to study, martial arts and Zen.

Early rise
At the age of 14, Kenshin was suddenly contacted by Usami Sadamitsu and a number of other acquaintances of his late father. They urged the young Nagao son to go to Echigo and contest his older brother's rule. It would seem that Harukage hadn't proven the most effective or inspiring leader (probably due to ill health), and his failure to exert control and gain support of the powerful kokujin families had resulted in a situation which was nearly to the point of tearing the province apart. As the story is told, at first Kenshin was reluctant to take the field against his own brother, but was eventually convinced that it was necessary to the survival of Echigo. At the age of 15 he was placed in joint command of Tochio Castle, making a reputation for himself by successfully defending it against the rebels who were plotting against the Uesugi, and Kenshin succeeded in wresting control of the Nagao clan from Nagao Harukage in 1548.

Nagao Harukage stepped down from the lead of the clan and provincial government and gave the titles to his younger brother. Harukage died five years later in 1553. At the age of 19 Kenshin became the head of the Nagao clan and entered the Kasugayama Castle, but still as the retainer of the Uesugi clan.

In the year 1551, Kenshin was called upon to provide refuge in his castle for his nominal lord, Uesugi Norimasa, who had been forced to flee there due to the expansion into the Kantō region by the lord Hōjō Ujiyasu from the Hōjō clan. He agreed to give the warlord shelter, under specific terms, but was not in a position at the time to move against the Hōjō. The terms were Norimasa's adoption of Kenshin as his heir, the change of name from Kagetora to Terutora (later Kenshin), the title Lord of Echigo, and the Kantō Kanrei post as shōguns deputy.

In 1552, the Uesugi started to wage war against the Hōjō clan. Though his rule over the Nagao and Uesugi clan were now unquestioned, much of Echigo was still independent of this young warlord's grasp. Kenshin immediately set out to cement his power in the region, but these efforts were still in their infant stages when far more pressing concerns appeared. Ogasawara Nagatoki and Murakami Yoshikiyo, two Shinano lords, both appeared before Kenshin requesting his help in halting the advances of the powerful warlord Takeda Shingen. Around the time Kenshin became the new lord of Echigo, Shingen had won major victories in Shinano Province. With the Takeda's conquests taking them remarkably close to the borders of Echigo, Kenshin agreed to take the field on two fronts, however the conflicts between the three lords showed also various alliances and treaties.

Kenshin's military success is related to his successful reform efforts on trade, market, transportation network (taxing mechanism in the port towns), and revenues generated by the cloth trade. The result was control over commerce which the previous government did not have. He also established feudal ties with the warrior population by land grants. The so-called Funai Statutes show the provisions that apply to the traditional elites and common folk, tax breaks due to war exhaustion, with intent to centralize and consolidate the lands around his capital, which were followed by further reforms for the consolidation of the imperial lands prior the 1560–1562 Kantō campaign. However, despite Kenshin's control over agriculture and the economy, he did not thoroughly implement key reforms such as cadastral surveys, important for military obligations, implying Kenshin's focus on commerce. The management of the administration, military organization, as well in some minor battles in Echigo Funai were handed by vassal Kurata Gorōzaemon.

Conflict with Takeda

What followed after the triple alliance of Kenshin was the beginning of a rivalry which became legendary in the history of Japan and the Sengoku period. In the first conflict between the two, both Uesugi Kenshin and Takeda Shingen were very cautious, only committing themselves to indecisive skirmishes. Over the years, there would be a total of five such engagements at the famous site of Kawanakajima (1553–1564), though only the fourth would prove to be a serious, all-out battle between the two.

4th Battle of Kawanakajima

In 1561, Kenshin and Shingen fought the biggest battle they would fight, the fourth battle of Kawanakajima. Kenshin used an ingenious tactic: a special formation where the soldiers in the front would switch with their comrades in the rear, as those in the frontline became tired or wounded. This allowed the tired soldiers to take a break, while the soldiers who had not seen action would fight on the front lines. This was extremely effective and because of this Kenshin nearly defeated Shingen. In Kōyō Gunkan there is one of the most famous instances of single combat in samurai history; during this battle, Kenshin managed to ride up to Shingen and slashed at him with his sword. Shingen fended off the blows with his iron war fan or tessen. Kenshin failed to finish Shingen off before a Takeda retainer drove him away. Shingen made a counter-attack and the Uesugi army retreated. The result of the fourth battle of Kawanakajima is still uncertain. Many scholars are divided on who the actual victor was, if the battle was actually decisive enough to even declare one, thus is generally considered a draw. It is considered to be the largest casualty battle in the Sengoku period, with loss of estimated 72 percent of Kenshin's army and 62 percent of Shingen's army, but Shingen also lost two of his most important generals during the battle, namely his advisor Yamamoto Kansuke and younger brother Takeda Nobushige. Some more conservative estimates place the casualties around 20 percent.

In 1563, Shingen allied with Hōjō Ujiyasu against the Uesugi clan, they captured Matsuyama Castle in Musashi Province. In 1565, Shingen then took Kuragano Castle and Minowa Castle in Kōzuke province. In 1571, Kenshin attacked Shingen's satellite Ishikura Castle in Kōzuke province, and they again faced each other at the Battle of Tonegawa, to once again disengage.

In addition, after Shingen broke with the Hōjō, there was an incident when the Hōjō boycotted salt supplies to Kai Province. When Kenshin heard of Shingen's problem, he sent salt to Shingen from his own province. Kenshin commented that the Hōjō had "performed a very mean act". Kenshin added, "I do not fight with salt, but with the sword".

Kenshin's respect for Shingen is evident from his reaction to Shingen's death: he privately wept and stated, "I have lost my good rival. We won't have a hero like that again!"

Conflict with Hōjō
Though his rivalry with Takeda Shingen was legendary, Uesugi Kenshin actually had a number of other ventures occurring around the times of these famous battles (1553–1564). In the year 1559, he made a trip with escort of 5,000 men to pay homage to the shōgun in Kyoto. This served to heighten his reputation considerably, and added to his image as a cultured leader as well as a warlord. This same year he was pushed once again by Uesugi Norimasa to take control of the Kantō back from the Hōjō, and in 1560 he was able to comply. In August of the same year, he put southern Echigo under control of a five-man council for broad mobilization, as well formed a small investigative council for any kind of unrest.

Siege of Odawara

Heading a campaign against Hōjō Ujiyasu from fall 1560 to the summer of 1561, Kenshin was successful in taking a number of castles from the clan, like Numata  Castle and Umayabashi Castle, which ended with the first siege of Odawara Castle in Sagami Province. He managed to break the defenses and burn the town, but the castle itself remained unconquered due to threats from Shingen, and thus seized Kamakura. 

In 1563, Kenshin saved his ally Ōta Sukemasa who was under siege by both Hōjō Ujiyasu and Takeda Shingen, while in November 1569 when Shingen sieged Odawara Castle, Ujiyasu requested help from Kenshin.

In 1566, after Yura clan of Kozuke Province changed their allegiance to Hojo clan. Later in 1574, Kenshin ordered the Satake clan to attack Yura clan Kanayama Castle, and participated in the siege himself, but Kanayama castle withstood the attack.

Uesugi expansion

The other main area which interested Uesugi Kenshin was Etchū Province in the west, and Kenshin would spend nearly half his life involved in the politics of that province. The land was inhabited by two feuding clans, the Jinbo and the Shiina. Kenshin first entered the dispute as a mediator in the early 1550s between rivals Shiina Yasutane and Jinbō Nagamoto, but he later sided with the Shiina and took over the Jinbo clan. Decades later, Kenshin turned against the Shiina clan, taking their main castle in 1575 and having Shiina Yasutane assassinated in 1576 by Kojima Motoshige.

In 1563, Kenshin occupied Sano Domain of Kōzuke Province. He besieged Karasawa Castle against Sano Masatsune and made strong inroads into the region, forcing many of the smaller warlords to submit to him.

At this point, by 1564 Kenshin controlled both Etchū Province and Kōzuke Province.  By the 1570s, Kenshin governed Echigo Province, some adjacent provinces, all Hokuriku seaboard, and routed Oda Nobunaga's forces in Echizen Province.

Conflict with Oda
Starting in the year 1576, Kenshin began to consider the issue of Oda Nobunaga, who had since grown to be Japan's most powerful warlord of the time. Kenshin broke his alliance with Nobunaga. Through the mediation of Ashikaga Yoshiaki, he reconciled with Kennyo, formed an alliance, and became a member of the power opposed to Nobunaga. With both Takeda Shingen and Hōjō Ujiyasu dead, Kenshin was no longer blocked off from this realm of expansion. So, when the death of Hatakeyama Yoshitaka, a lord in Noto Province, sparked up confusion and conflict, Kenshin was quick to use the opportunity, taking land from the weakened clan and successfully besieged Nanao Castle, which put him in a position to threaten Nobunaga and his allies. In response, Nobunaga pulled together his own forces and those of his two best generals, Shibata Katsuie and Maeda Toshiie, to meet Kenshin at the Battle of Tedorigawa (1577) in Kaga Province.

Battle of Tedorigawa

Kenshin based his 30,000 strong army at the castle of Matsuto, while Oda Nobunaga's forces arrived with 50,000 troops led by many famous generals. Despite Nobunaga's superior numbers, Kenshin managed to score a solid victory on the field. At first, Kenshin anticipated that Nobunaga would try to move by night over the river for dawn attack and thus refused to engage the Nobunaga army. Then he pretended to send forth a small unit to attack Nobunaga's main force from behind and gave his enemy a great opportunity to crush his remaining force. Nobunaga took the bait. Nobunaga's force attacked at night expecting a weakened opponent at the front; instead Kenshin's full military might was waiting. Having lost 1,000 men in combat and some more as the Oda troops attempted to escape across the Tedori River, Nobunaga ordered a retreat into Ōmi Province. However, Kenshin, who described the opponent's performance as "surprisingly weak", had a false impression to have defeated Nobunaga, as the Oda army was actually led by Shibata Katsuie. Eventually, Kenshin secured the Noto Province from the Oda clan.

Death

In October 1577, Uesugi Kenshin arranged to put forth a grand army to continue his assaults into Nobunaga's land. In 1578 he entered alliance with Takeda Katsuyori against Nobunaga, but held up by bad weather, he died of an esophageal cancer in the spring of 1578. His death poem was: 

The cause of Kenshin's death has been questioned throughout the years. The theory accepted by most scholars is that early sources record his deterioration of health condition, his complaints of pain in the chest "like an iron ball", and as Kenshin Gunki (1582) records "on the 9th day of the 3rd month he had a stomach ache in his toilet. This unfortunately persisted until the 13th day when he died". However, it is also speculated that he was victim of one of the most famous ninja assassinations, by a ninja concealed in the cesspool beneath the latrine at Kenshin's camp with a short spear or sword. The theories are not mutually exclusive — the assassin, if he existed, and was possibly sent by Nobunaga, might simply have fatally wounded an already-dying man. However, as his anticipation of his own death is recorded in the death poem, the possibility of the assassination is less likely.

Domestically, Kenshin left behind a succession crisis. While he never had any children of his own, Kenshin adopted two boys during his lifetime. His nephew, Uesugi Kagekatsu, was probably adopted for deflection of the antagonism by Kagekatsu's father, Nagao Masakage, relatives and supporters. Another adopted son, Uesugi Kagetora, who was originally the son of Hōjō Ujiyasu, was adopted to secure the Echigo's borders. Some suppose that Kagekatsu was intended to be gradually set up as his heir, while others that Kenshin decided to divide the estates between the two.

Both sons had external blood ties, and reasonable claims. Kagetora was besieged at Otate in 1578, and although contacted for aid Hōjō Ujimasa and Takeda Katsuyori, the former backed down. Kagekatsu married Takeda's sister, and eventually was able to secure his succession. Kagetora fled to a castle near the Echigo-Shinano border where he committed suicide in 1579.

The death caused local power struggles, with the result of almost decade long infighting in Echigo between 1578 and 1587, usually divided into "Otate Disturbance" (1578–1582) and "Shibata rebellion" (1582–1587). The resistance of the Kagetora's supporters continued for few years in north-central Echigo. In 1582, Shibata Shigeie, who was a vassal of Kagekatsu, led a rebellion in north Echigo, probably due to low rewards for his support of Kagekatsu, but even more the Kagekatsu's granting control over the toll barriers in the port of Niigata to Takemata Yoshitsuna.

However, in the aftermath of the costly internal struggle, the Oda clan exploited rebellions against Kagekatsu to advance right up to the border of Echigo, having captured Noto and Kaga while the Uesugi brothers were busy with the infighting. This combined with the destruction of the Takeda clan, Uesugi's then ally and long time Oda enemy, would come close to destroying the Uesugi clan before Oda Nobunaga's own death once again shattered the balance of power in Japan.

Kenshin festivals 

The Kenshin Festival  takes place every August in Jōetsu since 1926. The procession starts at Kasugayama Castle for the reenactment of the fourth Kawanakajima battle, with an army of 400–1,000 soldiers. Japanese singer-songwriter Gackt portrayed Kenshin on several occasions since 2007, and thanks to his participation, the festival in 2015 reached record high attendance of 243,000 people.

The Echigo Kenshin Sake Festival is held every October and reaches attendance of roughly 100,000 visitors.

Female Uesugi Kenshin theory

In the mid 20th century Japanese novelist Tomeo Yagiri theorized that Uesugi Kenshin was a woman after he discovered a report on 16th century Japan in the monastery of Toledo which was used as a fort during the Spanish Civil War. This report about Japan was written by a person named Gonzalez of Spain to King Philip II. In that report, Gonzalez refers to a certain Uesugi as "tia" (aunt) of Uesugi Kagekatsu, the biological son of Kenshin's sister. The discovery of this letter led the novelist to theorize that "in the West, Uesugi Kenshin is a woman". On this basis, Yagiri wrote the "上杉謙信女性説" (Female Uesugi Kenshin theory). Other evidence supporting this theory is that Kenshin had severe stomach cramps on a monthly basis around the 10th of the month (recorded in the Kōyō Gunkan) and actually planned his military campaigns around these cramps. The cause of Kenshin's death is recorded in Matsudaira Tadaaki's history "Tōdaiki" (当代記) as a form of uterine cancer (大虫).
 
According to some accounts of Kenshin's personal life, he had an interest in traditionally feminine subjects, such as historical novels, poetry, and calligraphy aimed at the female audience. Kenshin's appearance was reportedly feminine; portraits of Kenshin made in the Edo period (1600-1868) tried to reinforce a masculine appearance, while those of the Sengoku period (1467-1615) display a more female appearance, with fair skin and long hair. Kenshin was the only one allowed to freely enter the women's quarters in the Kyoto Imperial Palace, which was a rare occurrence. Kenshin had neither biological children nor wife or concubine. His relations with women and men are only written of in tales and nothing is historically proven.
 
In popular culture, the question regarding Kenshin's gender has often been answered by portraying Kenshin as female or as undefined gender. Critics of this theory claim that women could not succeed to the leadership of a samurai clan. Advocates of the theory refute the critics by noting that women leaders of samurai clans were not entirely unknown during the 16th century, as was the case of Tachibana Ginchiyo, Ii Naotora, Lady Otsuya, Otazu, Onamihime and others.

In popular culture 

Kenshin is the main protagonist of Chōgorō Kaionji's epic historical novel Ten to Chi to ("Heaven and Earth") and NHK taiga drama adaptation Ten to Chi to (1969) where was played by Kōji Ishizaka. Kenshin, played by Isao Natsuyagi is featured in 1979 film G.I. Samurai, and played by Eiichi Kanakubo is a minor character in Akira Kurosawa's 1980 jidaigeki Kagemusha. The 1990 movie adaptation of Kaionji's novel, Heaven and Earth directed by Haruki Kadokawa, where's Kenshin played by Takaaki Enoki, covers the rivalry between Uesugi Kenshin and Takeda Shingen, focusing mainly on the character of Kenshin who is referred to by his original name Kagetora. The film has been praised for its realistic depictions of warfare and battles of the period. Being a box office success in Japan, it is also famous for holding the world record for most saddled horses used in one sequence — 800 horses were in a battle segment. Kaionji's novel was also adapted by TV Asahi for their 50th anniversary as 2008 TV drama special where Kenshin was played by Masahiro Matsuoka. The manga Yukibana no Tora by Akiko Higashimura, serialised in Shogakukan's seinen manga magazine Hibana from March 2015 to August 2017, also portrays its main protagonist Kenshin as a woman. 

In the 2007 NHK taiga drama, Fūrin Kazan, Uesugi Kenshin is portrayed by Japanese singer-songwriter Gackt. Gackt recalls that Kenshin was always portrayed as a very tough man, but wanted to play him with the female myth in the mind, which presented him clean-shaven and with long hair, although received some harsh criticism, co-actor Ken Ogata expressed his approval of Gackt's work and audience demanded the increase of his role in the series. The 2009 NHK Taiga drama Tenchijin partly re-tells the story of Uesugi Kenshin, played by Hiroshi Abe, although its main focus is on Naoe Kanetsugu, the page and later advisor to Uesugi Kenshin's adopted son and heir Kagekatsu. Kenshin was again voiced by Gackt in the anime of the gag manga, Tono to Issho (2010–2011). The live-action drama Sengoku Basara: Moonlight Party cast actress Mayuko Arisue as Kenshin. Gackt participated in the production, but voiced Oda Nobunaga. Kenshin also appears in a gender bender parallel universe anime series Battle Girls: Time Paradox.

Kenshin has been featured in many video games, such as the Koei's Samurai Warriors and Warriors Orochi and Capcom's Sengoku Basara series. He is a playable character in Pokémon Conquest (Pokémon + Nobunaga's Ambition in Japan), where he is the warlord of Illusio with his partner Pokémon being Gallade and Mewtwo. A female Kenshin, as Nagao Kagetora, also appears in the mobile game Fate/Grand Order, voiced by actress and singer Nana Mizuki. Similarly appearing as a female character, Kenshin is found in the Rance series most notably in Sengoku Rance.

In Cobra Kai, Season 5 episode 2, Terry Silver shows Chozen a samurai sword that he purchased at an auction, telling Chozen that it was used by Kenshin in the fourth battle of Kawanakajima.

Quotes

Gallery

Honours
 Junior Second Rank (September 9, 1908; posthumous)

See also
 Naoe Kanetsugu
 Aya-Gozen

References

Sources

External links

 Samurai Archives – Uesugi Kenshin

1530 births
1578 deaths
Daimyo
Uesugi clan
Deified Japanese people
Deaths from cancer in Japan
Deaths from esophageal cancer
People from Niigata Prefecture